Boletus vermiculosoides is a species of bolete fungus in the family Boletaceae. Found in North America, it was described as new to science in 1971 by mycologists Alexander H. Smith and Harry Delbert Thiers. The type collection was made by Smith in Hartland, Michigan, in 1966.

See also

List of Boletus species
List of North American boletes

References

vermiculosoides
Fungi described in 1971
Fungi of North America
Taxa named by Harry Delbert Thiers
Taxa named by Alexander H. Smith